Schistura epixenos is a species of stone loach in the genus Schistura from the Nakai Plateau in Laos. It was described by the Belgian ichthyologist Maurice Kottelat in 2017 and does not feature in Fishbase yet.

References 

E
Taxa named by Maurice Kottelat
Fish described in 2017